Julian Grahame Eastoe (born January 1965) is Professor of Chemistry at the University of Bristol. His research interests span colloid and interface science, surfactant chemistry and applications of neutron scattering. He was educated at Solihull Sixth Form College and the University of East Anglia (BSc Chemistry, 1986; PhD, 1990).

He was awarded the Rideal Medal from the Royal Society of Chemistry and Society for Chemical Industry in 2007 for "distinction in colloid or interface science", and the 2015 ECIS-Solvay medal from the European Colloid and Interface Society “for original scientific work of outstanding quality". He is a Co-Editor of the Journal of Colloid and Interface Science.
 He has an h-index of 71 according to Google Scholar.

References 

1965 births
Living people
Alumni of the University of East Anglia
Academics of Durham University
Academics of the University of Bristol